National Maritime Institute or NMI is an autonomous state owned research and educational institute working as a statutory organization trains marines and carries out research in Bangladesh and is located in  Chittagong, Bangladesh.

History
The institute was founded in 1952 near Hazi Camp, Pahartali, Chittagong. After the Independence of Bangladesh 1971, the institute was relocated to Seamen's Hostel. In 1973 the Institute returned to its original location near the Hazi camp. The permanent campus of the institute was completed in 1994 with support of the Government of Bangladesh and the Government of Japan. The institute in under the Ministry of Shipping. It is the only state owned institution in Bangladesh providing maritime education in Bangladesh.

See also 
 Bangladesh Marine Fisheries Academy

References

Research institutes in Bangladesh
Government agencies of Bangladesh
1952 establishments in Pakistan
Organisations based in Dhaka
Maritime organizations